Abacetus alacer is a species of ground beetle in the subfamily Pterostichinae. It was described by Peringuey in 1896 and is an endemic species of Zimbabwe, Africa.

References

Endemic fauna of Zimbabwe
alacer
Beetles described in 1896
Insects of Southern Africa